The Huntingdon Valley Country Club is a golf, tennis and swim club located in Huntingdon Valley, Pennsylvania,  northeast of Philadelphia. In addition to a golf course, the club offers banquet and dining facilities. The golf course is rated as #79 best classic course in America by Golfweek Magazine (2013).

History
Huntingdon Valley Country Club was organized in June 1897. It was originally a nine-hole course and was subsequently expanded to 18 holes after acquiring additional land. The course was later moved to its present site in the mid-1920s.  Play started on the 27-hole layout on April 14, 1928.

Huntingdon Valley Country Club also was known as one of the first places to play the sport of squash. Huntingdon Valley Country Club started one of the first tournaments for Squash in the early 1900s.

Scorecard

References

External links

Golf clubs and courses in Pennsylvania
Sports venues completed in 1897
1897 establishments in Pennsylvania
Buildings and structures in Montgomery County, Pennsylvania